Liberty Township is an inactive township in Marion County, in the U.S. state of Missouri. It was established in 1827.

References

Townships in Missouri
Townships in Marion County, Missouri